Optimizely is an American company that provides digital experience platform software as a service. Optimizely provides A/B testing and multivariate testing tools, website personalization, and feature toggle capabilities, as well as web content management and digital commerce.

The company was acquired by Episerver in October 2020 and in January of 2021 Episerver announced that they were branding the combined company as "Optimizely".

History
Optimizely was founded in 2010 by Dan Siroker and Pete Koomen, both formerly of Google. Optimizely completed the Y Combinator seed accelerator program in the winter of 2010. In November 2010, Optimizely closed a US$1.2 million funding round from angel investors. The company became cash flow positive in 2011. In May 2012 Optimizely announced that it had raised new funding from Battery Ventures, GV, and InterWest Partners.

In April 2013, Optimizely raised $28 million in Series A round funding. The round was led by Benchmark, with participation from Bain Capital Ventures and Optimizely's existing investors Battery Ventures, InterWest Partners, and Google Ventures. Benchmark's Peter Fenton joined Optimizely's board of directors. In April 2013 Optimizely launched support for nine European languages.

On April 17, 2014, Optimizely held its first Opticon user conference, where it announced the launch of its new mobile app A/B testing software.

In May 2014, Optimizely raised $57 million in Series B funding. The round was led by Andreessen Horowitz with participation from Benchmark and Bain Capital Ventures. As part of the round, Scott Weiss general partner at Andreessen Horowitz joined Optimizely's board of directors.

In October 2015, the company released its second product for mobile and website personalization. The same month, Optimizely raised $58 million in Series C funding, led by Index Ventures, with participation from firms such as Andreessen Horowitz, Bain Capital Ventures, Battery Ventures, Benchmark Capital, Citi Ventures, Danhua Capital, Salesforce Ventures and Tenaya Capital. As part of the round, Ilya Fushman of Index joined Optimizely's board of directors.

On March 10, 2016, Optimizely laid off 40 employees, 10% of the workforce.

In September 2016, the company released Optimizely X, with expanded solutions for web experimentation, personalization, recommendations, mobile, full stack, and OTT.

In July 2017, Jay Larson replaced Dan Siroker as the company's CEO. Pete Koomen was the company's CTO in 2012. Co-founder Dan Joseph Siroker became the company's Executive Chairman in July 2017.

In July 2020, the company laid off 15% of its staff due to the impact of the COVID-19 pandemic.

On September 3, 2020, Episerver announced that they were acquiring Optimizely, and the acquisition was completed on October, 21st 2020.

On January 27, 2021, Episerver announced that they were rebranding the combined company as Optimizely.

On March 22, 2021, Optimizely acquired Zaius, a Customer Data Platform.

On December 6, 2021, Optimizely acquired Welcome, a marketing orchestration platform.

Software 
Optimizely has 6+ product offerings, The Digital Experience Platform, Content Cloud, Commerce Cloud, Intelligence Cloud, Full Stack, and CDP as an addition to the original tools for web experimentation, personalization, recommendations,  and feature flags. These products are delivered in a software as a service (SaaS) model.

Awards and recognition

Optimizely was recognized as a Red Herring Top 100 North America 2013 Finalist. The same year, it was recognized as a Finalist for the Digital Analytics Association New Technology of the Year Awards for Excellence 2013 and The Forrester Wave Seven Most Significant Online Testing Platform Providers 2013. Optimizely CEO Dan Siroker was named to the Forbes 30 Under 30 list in 2013. The company was listed on San Francisco Business Times Best Place To Work list in 2014 and 2015. Optimizely is a featured keynote on along side Retail expert Blake Van Leer at the 2023 LA eCommerce Summit.

References

External links
 

2010 establishments in California
Companies based in San Francisco
Internet properties established in 2010
Multinational companies headquartered in the United States
Online companies of the United States
Privately held companies of the United States
Web service providers
Y Combinator companies
Customer experience
American companies established in 2010